is a Japanese multimedia franchise produced by Syn Sophia and Takara Tomy Arts aimed at girls in elementary school. The Pretty Rhythm franchise was first launched in July 2010 with the rhythm and dress-up arcade game Pretty Rhythm: Mini Skirt. After the original Pretty Rhythm games ended service in July 2014, Takara Tomy began publishing the PriPara spin-off series from 2014 to 2018. It was then followed up by Kiratto Pri Chan in 2018, with all series grouped under the collective name . A spinoff media franchise, King of Prism, was launched in 2016 focusing on the male characters featured in the 2013 anime Pretty Rhythm: Rainbow Live, which was aimed at an older female audience.

The popularity of the series has led to several anime and manga adaptations. In addition, the Pretty Rhythm franchise has also inspired a junior apparel brand, Prism Stone. In 2012, one of their fashion events previously held the Guinness World Records for having the most models modeling on the catwalk.

Development

The Pretty Rhythm arcade games were created out of demand for the lack of arcade games targeted towards young girls in supermarkets. As Syn Sophia had produced the Style Savvy series, Takara Tomy Arts asked them to collaborate on another game for the same demographic. The development team gave the game a fashion focus, particularly on the idea that players could receive a "Prism Stone" to accessorize their outfits with every  they spend. The development team also intended for the game's presentation to be like the Cirque du Soleil, where they finally came up with the concepts of "dance", "skating" and "jumps." To create the Prism Jumps, they referenced videos from figure skating competitions and added special effects to make them more visually attractive, with names for the Prism Jumps that were easy to remember. A costume designer designed the clothing in the game, and programmer Daisuke Kato attempted to balance the varieties of clothing in order to encourage the player to try different outfits. Pretty Rhythm went into development in 2009 before releasing in July 2010 with Pretty Rhythm: Mini Skirt.

Games

The Pretty Rhythm series focuses on Prism Stars, idols performing figure skating routines through song and dance with special moves known as Prism Jumps. The characters participate in Prism Shows, live performances that are scored based on how charmed the audience is. The game is a rhythm game where players must match the beat of the song by pressing buttons corresponding to the pink and blue hearts on the screen. The game costs  to play for solo mode, and beginning with Pretty Rhythm: Rainbow Live Duo, costs  to play duo mode. Each machine is compatible with Prism Stones, collectible heart-shaped gems containing custom clothing for the player character, and Memory Passes, which allow players to save their game's progress. Five different types of Prism Stones, each representing a clothing category, can be used at the same time during game playthrough to customize the player character's appearance, with certain clothing and stage combinations providing bonus points. Players are awarded Prism Stones, which are deposited from the machine, before the game begins.

Pretty Rhythm: Mini Skirt

Pretty Rhythm: Mini Skirt, the first version of the game, was launched in arcades on July 15, 2010. At the time of the game's launch, a total of 84 variations of Prism Stones were produced, featuring approximately 200,000 possible outfit combinations. The game also included the song "Mini Skirt no Yosei" as a playable stage, which was performed by then-trainee members from AKB48, Miyu Takeuchi, Anna Mori, and Haruka Shimada under the group name Mini Skirt. The season 2 update of the game, the "Fall Collection", launched on October 14, 2010. For a limited time, the members of Mini Skirt were featured in a playable stage that awarded players a Prism Stone with their uniforms, and they were featured in promotional material regarding the expansion. Season 3, "Collection Season 3", launched on January 20, 2011.

Pretty Rhythm: Aurora Dream

Beginning with season 4, the game was relaunched under the name Pretty Rhythm: Aurora Dream on April 28, 2011 to coincide with the anime adaptation tie-in, with Aira Harune added as a playable character. The game also featured a new system called a "Surprise Jump." Season 5, "Bato Pon Edition", launched on July 21, 2011. Season 6, "Idol Debut Edition", launched on September 29, 2011. Season 7, "Pretty Remake Edition", launched on December 15, 2011 and added Mion Takamine as a playable character. Season 8, "Prism Queen Edition", launched on February 12, 2012.

Pretty Rhythm: Dear My Future

Pretty Rhythm: Dear My Future was launched on April 26, 2012 with its season 9 update, "Prizmmy Debut Edition", as a tie-in to the animated adaptation of the same name, which included new characters Mia Ageha, Reina Miyama, Karin Shijimi, and Ayami Oruri, fictional versions of the girl group Prizmmy. The game featured a new system that focuses on "Prism Acts." Season 10, "Pretty Debut Edition", was launched on July 19, 2012, adding Hye-in, So-min, Shi-yoon, Chae-kyung, and Jae-eun, the fictionalized versions of the girl group of Puretty, as playable characters. Season 11, "Dear My Future Team Shuffle Edition", was launched on September 27, 2012.

Pretty Rhythm: Rainbow Live / Rainbow Live Duo

Pretty Rhythm: Rainbow Live was launched on April 18, 2013 as a new series and tie-in to the animated adaptation of the same name, which introduced a new mode called "Prism Live", where the player character can enter a bonus round to score more points with Prism Jump combinations. Pair Friends were also introduced in the game. The session 1 update was titled the "Prism Live Debut Edition" and added Naru Ayase, Ann Fukuhara, and Ito Suzuno as playable characters, along with Rinne, who had previously appeared in the Nintendo 3DS game Pretty Rhythm: My Deco Rainbow Wedding. The session 2 update, "All Rare! Ki-ra-me-ki Days Edition", was launched on July 11, 2013, and added Bell Renjoji, Otoha Takanashi, and Wakana Morizono as playable characters.

The session 3 update, "Chara Stone! Heartbeat Edition", was launched on October 3, 2013, and the game was rebranded under the title Pretty Rhythm: Rainbow Live Duo. The session 3 update added June Amou as a playable character and a two-player co-op mode called "Duo Mode" to perform Prism Lives together. The session 4 update, "Surprise! Winter White Edition", was launched on January 25, 2014 with Starn available as a Pair Friend. It also included a special mode that was only accessible with the Prism Memory Pass.

Pretty Rhythm: All Star Legend Coord Edition

Beginning April 17, 2014, the arcade game was retitled Pretty Rhythm: All Star Legend Coord Edition with 84 new Prism Stones produced. Pretty Rhythm ended services in July 2014 and was pulled from arcades afterwards, with a few machines remaining in the Prism Stone shops located in Harajuku, Sapporo, Fukuoka, and Nagoya.  While the Memory Passes and Prism Stones are still functional, Prism Stones are no longer being produced.

Other media

A Nintendo 3DS port of Pretty Rhythm: Mini Skirt, titled Pretty Rhythm: My Deco Rainbow Wedding, was released on March 20, 2013. A new character, Rinne, was added as a playable character in the game, as well as the female cast from Pretty Rhythm: Aurora Dream and Pretty Rhythm: Dear My Future. Progressing through the game allowed players to unlock QR codes for new outfits that were compatible with the arcade game. The limited edition version of the game came with the Rainbow Wedding Prism Stone that could be used in the arcade game. The game sold 33,466 copies in its first week of sales and 61,366 copies by June 2013.

Pretty Rhythm: Rainbow Live: Kirakira My Design was released for the Nintendo 3DS on November 28, 2013. The game features the main female cast of Rainbow Live as playable characters along with a new character, Cosmo Hojo, as well as the female cast from Pretty Rhythm: Aurora Dream and Pretty Rhythm: Dear My Future. The game sold 35,511 copies by the end of 2013.

An expanded version of Kirakira My Design was released for the Nintendo 3DS on January 5, 2015, under the title PriPara & Pretty Rhythm: PriPara de Tsukaeru Oshare Item 1450!, adding Hiro Hayami and PriPara character Laala Manaka as playable characters. The game also included QR codes for unlockable secret outfits in the PriPara arcade game.

On March 7, 2015, a smartphone app mobile game titled Pretty Rhythm Shake was released for the Android and iOS, with pre-registrations opening on February 10, 2015 for a limited edition in-game card of Rinne. The game was part of the Shake rhythm game series produced by Dooub. In the game, the player must match the falling hearts to three corresponding hearts to the beat of the song and use virtual Prism Stones accumulated from each play to level up their characters. The game primarily focused on the main cast of Pretty Rhythm: Rainbow Live, but proceeding through the game will provide Aurora Dream and Dear My Future characters and songs as unlockable content, as well as the male supporting cast of Rainbow Live. Avex Pictures ended services for the game on May 31, 2017 due to "various reasons."

Playable songs

Spin-offs

PriPara

After Pretty Rhythm ended support in July 2014, it was replaced by the series' successor, PriPara. PriPara was first launched in arcades on July 10, 2014. The franchise introduced PriPara character Laala Manaka through Pretty Rhythm: All Star Selection. A second arcade game, Idol Time PriPara, was launched on April 1, 2017 to coincide with the animated adaptation of the same name. Three years after the conclusion of Idol Time PriPara, a third series titled Idol Land PriPara was announced for a Q2 2021 release, released as a mobile app with an accompanying anime series. Idol Land PriPara was delayed until Q3 2021.

King of Prism

King of Prism is a film series focusing on the male characters of Pretty Rhythm: Rainbow Live, targeting an older female demographic. The 2016 film King of Prism by Pretty Rhythm grossed  in two months at the Japanese box office, where it eventually grossed  by the end of its run.

Pretty All Friends

In December 2017, to prepare for the franchise's 10th anniversary, a project titled Pretty All Friends was launched. In 2018, a merchandise line was launched.

In August 2018, Icrea attempted to launch a line of body pillow covers featuring the lead female characters in swimsuits and posing suggestively for sale at Comic Market, as a collaboration with the Pretty All Friends merchandise line. They were met with criticism from Japanese and Korean fans for sexualizing characters from a children's show. Tatsunoko Productions responded by making the products for purchase on Internet only before cancelling it altogether.

Kiratto Pri Chan

After PriPara ended services in 2018, it was succeeded by Kiratto Pri Chan. The game was launched in arcades on April 19, 2018.

Waccha PriMagi!

Manga

A manga adaptation of Pretty Rhythm: Mini Skirt, titled Pretty Rhythm, was written and illustrated by Mari Asabuki, focusing on playable characters Rizumu, Serena, and Kanon, members of the group Asterism. It was serialized in Ribon from July 3, 2010 to 2012 and later compiled into tankoban volumes by Shueisha under the Ribon Mascot Comics imprint. The titles were released on digital platforms on May 22, 2013.

In addition to Asabuki's adaptation, Pretty Rhythm: Aurora Dream ran concurrently in Ciao from 2011 to 2012. Dear My Future, Rainbow Live, and All Star Selection also received manga adaptations in Pucchigumi.

 Pretty Rhythm (2010-2012)
 Pretty Rhythm: Aurora Dream (2011-2012)
 Pretty Rhythm: Dear My Future (2012-2013)
 Pretty Rhythm: Rainbow Live (2013-2014)
 Pretty Rhythm: All Star Selection (2014)

Anime

The series is animated by Tatsunoko Productions and published by Avex Pictures, with all shows broadcasting on TV Tokyo.

A live-action variety show segment called "Pretty Rhythm Studio" appeared at the end of every episode and was centered on Prism Mates, a group of tween trainees from Avex Dance Master consisting of Mia Kusakabe, Reina Kubo, and Karin Takahashi, chronicling their journey to debut. Near the end of Pretty Rhythm: Aurora Dream, the girls debuted in the group Prizmmy along with Ayami Sema, the winner of the Pretty Rhythm Award at the Kiratto Entertainment Challenge Contest 2011 Summer. During Dear My Future, a new group of trainees appeared as the Prism Mates and participated in the segments along with Prizmmy. By Rainbow Live, the segment was retitled "Pretty Rhythm Club."

Television series

 Pretty Rhythm: Aurora Dream (2011-2012)
 Pretty Rhythm: Dear My Future (2012-2013)
 Pretty Rhythm: Rainbow Live (2013-2014)
 King of Prism: Shiny Seven Stars (2019)
 Pretty Rhythm: All Star Selection (2014)
 PriPara (2014-2016)
 Idol Time PriPara (2017-2018)
 Idol Land PriPara (2021)
 Kiratto Pri Chan (2018–2021)
 Pretty All Friends Selection (2021-present)
 Waccha PriMagi! (2021)

Films

 Pretty Rhythm: All Star Selection: Prism Show Best Ten (2014)
 Gekijō-ban PriPara: Minna Atsumare! Prism Tours (2015)
 King of Prism by Pretty Rhythm (2016)
 King of Prism: Pride the Hero (2017)
 King of Prism: Shiny Seven Stars (2019)
 PriPara Minna no Akogare Let's Go PriPari (2016)
 Gekijōban PriPara & Kiratto Pri Chan: Kira Kira Memorial Live (2018)

Merchandise

Prism Stone

Prism Stone, a brand-name store featured in all series, was launched to coincide with Pretty Rhythm: Aurora Dream as a tie-in to the franchise. Its flagship store opened at the Yokohama Landmark Tower in April 2011, where Aurora Dream is set. Since then, several stores have been opened up nationwide in Japan. Aside from selling character goods, Prism Stone also sells a junior apparel line in "lovely" and "pop" designs. The store also carried clothing from junior apparel brands Roni and EarthMagic, who have released collaboration Prism Stones for the arcade games in the past.

On March 30, 2012, the Pretty Rhythm franchise held an event titled Pretty Girls Dream Challenge 2012 in Yokohama, where 1,274 child models appeared on the catwalk. The event previously set the Guinness World Record for having the most models modeling on the catwalk at an event.

As a tie-in to Pretty Rhythm: Rainbow Live, a store was opened up in Harajuku in 2013, where Rainbow Live is set. It became the Pretty Series''' main store after their flagship store in Yokohama closed in 2016.

Dear Crown

In 2012, along with a Prism Stone shop launched at Odaiba Venus Fort, Dear Crown, a second apparel shop, launched its flagship store at the same location as a tie-in to Pretty Rhythm: Dear My Future. Dear Crown was described as a sister apparel brand and counterpart to Prism Stone, featuring junior clothing in "cool" and "sexy" designs. In the anime series, the shop was represented by the main characters' rivals, such as Puretty, Bell Rose, and June. Dear Crown closed down in 2014 following the end of Pretty Rhythm: Rainbow Live, but it reopened in 2015 when the brand was introduced in PriPara. In 2016, Dear Crown closed again, with all products being now distributed through Prism Stone.

In February 2013, plans for both Prism Stone and Dear Crown shops to open in South Korea were announced as a tie-in to Pretty Rhythm: Dear My Future airing in the country, but they were ultimately dropped.

ReceptionPretty Rhythm: Mini Skirt'' was popular among girls between 8–10 years old, with over 2,000 units available in arcades in 2011. By 2012, Prism Stone had earned  in merchandise sales.

References

External links
 

 
Arcade video games
Collectible-based games
Japanese idols in anime and manga
Figure skating in anime and manga
Dance in anime and manga
Music in anime and manga
Music video games
Mass media franchises introduced in 2010
Shueisha manga
Shōjo manga
Syn Sophia games
Takara Tomy franchises
Tatsunoko Production